Avenida Paulista no dia da Inauguração, 8 de Dezembro de 1891 is a painting by . It is considered the first image of the Paulista Avenue, in São Paulo.

The painting is located in the Museu Paulista as part of the Fundo Museu Paulista Collection and registered under the inventory number 1-08672-0000-0000.

References

Brazilian paintings
Museu do Ipiranga
1891 paintings